"Ooh Ahh" is a single by American Christian hip hop group GRITS featuring TobyMac. It was recorded for their fourth studio album, The Art of Translation. It was produced by Ric "DJ Form" Robbins and Otto Price for Incorporated Elements. The song was written by Ric Robbins, Otto Price, Coffee and Bone of Grits, and TobyMac. It is sometimes referred to as "My Life Be Like" or "My Life Be Like (Ooh Ahh)". A cut from the song is featured on tobyMac's song, "Catchafire (Whoopsi-Daisy)" from his album Welcome to Diverse City. To date, "Ooh Ahh" has been RIAA Digital Certified Gold for over 500,000 downloads and on-demand streams, subsequently going Platinum in January 2019.

Releases
GRITS released the Ooh Ahh EP in 2007. It features the songs "Ooh Ahh", "Ooh Ahh (Liquid Remix)", and "Open Bar". "Ooh Ahh" was released on The Greatest Hits, which was also released in 2007. It was the fifth title from the compilation album. The song was the second track on The Art of Translation, which was released in 2002. In 2014 Capital Kings and John Reuben covered "Ooh Ahh" and it was released in the 20-year anniversary album Gotee Records: 20 Years Brand New and later in the physical version of Fireblazin.

EP track listing

Certifications

References

2002 singles
Gotee Records singles
Hip hop songs
Internet memes